West Grove may refer to:

United States
 West Grove, Indiana
 West Grove, Iowa
 West Grove, New Jersey
 West Grove, Pennsylvania

United Kingdom
 West Grove (Cardiff), a street in Wales